Handvo is a savory vegetable cake originating from Gujarat, India. It is a part of the Gujarati cuisine. It is often made with a bottle gourd filling, though many other vegetables can be added. Sometimes crushed peanuts are also added.

Preparation
Handvo batter is made by mixing rice and various lentils, which are rinsed, dried, and then ground. The pulses are mixed with yogurt to prepare a fermented batter. The batter is mixed with yogurt and spices and is then steamed.

Variations 
Handvo can be made with moong dal (split yellow gram) or chola dal (split cow peas) instead of rice. Vegetable handvo is a variety based on gram flour and contains vegetables like peas, cabbage, and also includes garam masala. It is often eaten along with pickle or tea.

References

Indian wheat dishes
Gujarati cuisine